Haciendo El Amor Con La Ropa is the debut studio album released by Speedy on January 17, 2001.

Track listing 
 "Intro"
 "Quiero Tu Cuerpo"
 "Fin De Semana" (feat. Great Kilo)
 "Muévete"
 "Yo Quiero Darte" (feat. Yaga y Mackie)
 "Ven Gata Ven" (feat. Rey Pirin)
 "Con Un Arma"
 "Para Que Bailen" (feat. Daddy Yankee)
 "Girla"
 "Mi Voz" (feat. Plan B)
 "Te Deseo Mujer" (feat. Blade Pacino)
 Mix by DJ Joe
 Mix by DJ Blass

References

2001 debut albums
Speedy (musician) albums